Rock the Spot, sometimes referred as RTS, is an annual b-boying event held in London, Ontario, Canada. The event attracts spectators and dancers from around Ontario as well as nearby areas such as Quebec, Michigan and New York. The main feature of the event is a breakdance competition between crews however, there are often performances by specially invited dance groups which showcase funk or choreographed hip hop dance acts before or between rounds of the competition. Winners of the competition are chosen by a panel of special guest judges and prizes are awarded.

History 
Rock the Spot first took place on June 2, 2001, and was organized by Kyler Ayim (Bboy Ka Boom) and Matthew Kang (Bboy 12-Step). The original Rock the Spot was a success however there was no event the following years until it was reinstated by main organizer Joseph Chen-Fu Hsieh (Bboy FoOL-Fu) and executive members of the UWO Breakers, a breakdancing club at the University of Western Ontario, in 2005. The original organizers no longer have a major role in organizing the now yearly event, however they have remained a part of RTS as the Master of Ceremonies (Ayim) and as a judge (Kang). Rock the Spot 2 and Rock the Spot 3 took place on March 25, 2005, and February 18, 2006, respectively, both at Huron University College at the University of Western Ontario. Rock the Spot 4 took place in February 2007.

Winner Teams 

Rock the Spot 4 (2007)
Winner - ?
Runner-up - ?
 3rd place - ?
Rock the Spot 3 (2006) 
Winner - Stylordz (Hamilton / Toronto)
Runner-up - Poizon Applez (Syracuse NY, USA)
3rd place - Ill Manners (Hamilton / Toronto)
Rock the Spot 2 (2005)
Winner - Albino Zebrahz (London)
Runner-up - Stylordz (Hamilton / Toronto)
Rock the Spot 1 (2001)
Winner - Albino Zebrahz (London)

Participating crews in Rock the Spot 3 

Poizon Applez Crew (Syracuse NY, USA)
Wizards of Rhythm (Rochester NY, USA)
Area 51 (Montreal)
Da F.A.M. (Toronto)
Illamentz (Toronto)
DEFinity Crew (Toronto)
Supernaturalz (Toronto)
Guilty Bratz Krew (Toronto)
UTM (Mississauga)
Ground Illusionz (Mississauga)
Illmanners (Hamilton / Toronto)
Stylordz (Hamilton / Toronto)
Dressed 2 Kill (Windsor)
NEBC (Cambridge)
Hungry Hungry Hippos (Sarnia / London / Toronto)
Albino Zebrahz (London)
Nomadz (London)
Crazy Ghost Crew (London)

DJs of RTS3 
Sangua (Mississauga)
Jazz-lo (Mississauga)
Megabass (London)

Judges of RTS3 
FoOL-Fu (London)
Mantis (USA)
FloMaster (Bronx, USA)
Pieces (Toronto)
Mae Hem (Toronto)

Performance Teams of RTS3 
VyBE FX (Toronto)
Hip-Hop Western (London)
Funk Fantastic (Hamilton / Toronto / Waterloo)

Special Guests of RTS3 
K-Mel (Bronx, USA)
FloMaster (Bronx, USA)
etc. (info will be up soon...)

Sponsors of RTS3 
Tim Hortonz
MTV Canada (Video coverage)
Central Clothing

Judges of RTS2 
Bboy No-Way (London)
Bboy Kee (Toronto)
Bboy 12-step (London / Toronto)

DJs of RTS2 
Raiz (Hamilton)
Mondo (Toronto)

Performance Teams of RTS2 
Fo' Real (Toronto)
Grace (Waterloo)
ScrambleLegz (Hamilton)

Sponsors of RTS2 
Rickshaw Taiwanese Restaurant
Mad Dog Clothing

External links 
  Promo video, event information, DVD sales, and more
LondonBboys.ca - Website of the current Rock the Spot organizers
Routines highlights video on YouTube.com - Compilation of teamwork / multi-person routines during the competition

Breakdance
Street dance competitions
Hip hop dance